Lashes are whip strokes on the human body.

Lashes may also refer to:

 Lisa Lashes (born 1971), British DJ
 The Lashes, a Seattle-based power pop band

See also

 Lash (disambiguation)